The Mississauga Marathon was an annual marathon race held in Mississauga, Ontario, Canada. It was held from 2004 to 2022. The race was a qualifier for the Boston Marathon.

Beginning in 2023, it was replaced by a new event, the Mississauga Half, which includes a half marathon, 10K and 5K races.

History 
With a mandate of "A Run for Everyone", the Mississauga Marathon has a festival atmosphere where spectators, volunteers, runners and their
families enjoy a day of fitness and entertainment.  The event includes the full marathon, half marathon, team relay challenge,
10K & 10K student relay, a community favourite, "The Hazel" 5K and the 2K Family Fun Run/Walk rounds out the
weekend ensuring that there truly is an event for everyone.

Route 
This point to point course is a fast net downhill. The course starts at Mississauga's City Hall, and makes its way west across the Credit River to Mississauga Road and then travels south for a beautiful stretch past the University of Toronto's Mississauga Campus, Mississauga Golf and Country Club, and continues through some of Mississauga's most beautiful residential neighbourhoods, before winding along the scenic Lake Ontario Waterfront Trail, and back along the Lakeshore to the finish at Lakefront Promenade Park. Small inclines are found at 10 km and 24 km. The 'net' downhill aspect of this race still exists, however, with a 250' (or 80m) drop from start to finish.

See also
 List of marathon races in North America

References
3. Ethiopian marathoner still running, but not from home
4. Toronto and Mississauga marathon: Road closures and TTC diversions
5.More than 8,000 partake in rainy Mississauga Marathon

External links 
 Mississauga Marathon

Marathons in Canada
Recurring sporting events established in 2004
Sport in Mississauga
Annual sporting events in Canada
2004 establishments in Ontario